Alice is an  steam locomotive. It was built in 1902 by the Hunslet Engine Company (works number 780) for the Dinorwic slate quarry  at Llanberis, in North Wales. It was originally called No. 4; there was an earlier locomotive called Alice which was built in 1889 (works number 492) and later renamed King of the Scarlets.

Alice Class

There were eleven engines of Dinorwic 'Alice' class supplied between 1886 and 1932, the first of which was Velinheli (Works No. 409 of 1886), but the class was named after the first Alice (Works No.492 of 1889) to avoid confusion with the separate Port Dinorwic organisation. Over 46 years a number of changes were made to the design, some so substantial as to warrant an unofficial sub-class known as the Port Class.

Alice no. 780
Alice, in common with most of the class, did not have a dome but a steam chamber produced by the firebox outer shell being raised some six inches above the boiler barrel. It was not usual to fit cabs to these engines since they had to work under incline bridges and through tunnels in the quarries.

Alice spent all of its life working on various galleries at the Dinorwic slate quarry. The locomotive was in consequence rarely photographed. By the early 1960s the locomotive was out of use and was partially dismantled to provide spares for her sister locomotives at Dinorwic. She was parked in a shed at the Australia gallery.

Restoration

When the quarry at Dinorwic closed in 1969, Alice’s remains were still at the Australia gallery. The wheels and underparts had been salvaged and these were sold as spares for her sister locomotive Holy War.

Holy War was the last steam locomotive to work in a slate quarry, ending her working life in November 1967. The locomotive was purchased, along with the spares from Alice, by J. Marshfield Hutchings and went to Quainton Road, Buckinghamshire. In 1975 Holy War and the spares from Alice were purchased by the Rev. Alan Cliff, Vice-President of the Bala Lake Railway Society and brought to Llanuwchllyn, the headquarters of the Bala Lake Railway, and were leased to the railway.

In the meantime, Alice’s frames and tank were recovered and taken to the West Lancashire Light Railway at Hesketh Bank, near Preston. In 1977 these remains were acquired jointly by Alan Cliff and George Barnes, who was then the General Manager and Chief Mechanical Engineer of the Bala Lake Railway. Their acquisition meant that what remained of Alice was together again.

The Bala Lake Railway was loaned the parts of Alice and announced that it intended to rebuild the locomotive as a  tender locomotive. However, many other priorities made that intention impossible, although some work was done on the frames.

In 1987, Chris Scott, then a Bala Lake Railway volunteer, bought the remains from Alan Cliff. The railway company had decided that it could not pursue the restoration, although it listed Alice as in their stock from 1977. Alan Cliff, who had been taken ill at the beginning of 1987 and forced to take early retirement, was in no position to spearhead a campaign to restore Alice, so when Scott offered to purchase the locomotive and seek to restore her, Alan and the Bala Lake Railway were delighted. What remained of Alice was later moved to Scott's garage.

Preservation

Chris Scott was at that time a volunteer fireman on the Ffestiniog Railway, and the first outing for Alice after her long restoration was in April 1994 on that railway, initially in the yard at Boston Lodge and later along the full length of the main line up to Blaenau Ffestiniog.

On 19 June 1994, Alice arrived at the Leighton Buzzard Light Railway. Mrs Alice Hyde, whose son Bill was a driver on the Bala Lake Railway, had set up a bookstall to raise money for the locomotive’s restoration, and Scott promised that when the engine ran again it should be re-dedicated to and by its namesake and benefactor. During the railway’s Steam Gala event on 10 September 1994, Mrs Hyde, who had travelled down from Bala in North Wales, re-dedicated the name of the locomotive Alice. On the following day Alice worked her first passenger train, double-headed with Barclay steam locomotive Doll. Alice was later fitted with braking equipment and operated passenger trains on its own.

Alice visited the Welsh Highland Railway on 19–20 September 1998 for the first Enthusiasts' Weekend. The loco was based at Leighton Buzzard for its first ten years of operation in preservation, following which it moved to Rheilffordd Llyn Tegid Bala Lake Railway, in 2003 where it was painted black.

In 2010, the locomotive was purchased by Julian Birley and restored to Dinorwic red.

References 

0-4-0ST locomotives
Individual locomotives of Great Britain
Preserved narrow gauge steam locomotives of Great Britain
Hunslet narrow gauge locomotives
2 ft gauge locomotives
Railway locomotives introduced in 1902